The Glass Bead Game is the seventh studio album by James Blackshaw. It was released in the United States on May 26, 2009.

Track listing
"Cross" – 8:38
"Bled" – 10:25
"Fix" – 5:38
"Key" – 6:02
"Arc" – 18:48

References

2009 albums
James Blackshaw albums
Young God Records albums
Instrumental albums